The 1951 Tour de France was the 38th edition of the Tour de France, taking place from 4 to 29 July. The race started outside Île-de-France for the first time since 1926; a change that remained permanent beyond 1951 with the exceptions of 1963, 1983, 1984, 1986 and 2003.

The race was won by Swiss cyclist Hugo Koblet. Koblet used his time-trial abilities to win large amounts of time. Dutch cyclist Wim van Est made fame, not only by becoming the first Dutch cyclist to lead the Tour de France, but more by falling down a ravine in the leader's jersey.

Teams

As was the custom since the 1930 Tour de France, the 1951 Tour de France was contested by national and regional teams. The three major cycling countries in 1951, Italy, Belgium and France, each sent a team of 12 cyclists. Other countries sent teams of 8 cyclists: Switzerland, Luxembourg, Netherlands and Spain. The French regional cyclists were divided into four teams of 12 cyclists: Paris, Île-de-France/North-West, East/South-East and West/South-West. The last team of eight cyclists was made up out of cyclists from the French North African colonies. In the end, Luxembourg only sent 7 cyclists, so altogether this made 123 cyclists. There were 68 French cyclists (of which 1 French-Moroccan and 7 French-Algerian), 12 Italian, 12 Belgian, 8 Dutch, 8 Spanish, 8 Swiss and 7 Luxembourgian cyclists.

The teams entering the race were:

 Switzerland
 Italy
 Belgium
 France
 Luxembourg
 Netherlands
 Spain
 Paris
 Île-de-France/North-West
 East/South-East
 West/South-West
 North Africa

Route and stages

The 1951 Tour de France started in Metz; it was the second time after the 1926 Tour de France that the start of the Tour de France was not in or near Paris. 

Unlike in previous years, the route was no longer around the perimeter of France, and the Massif Central mountains were visited for the first time. There were two rest days, in Limoges and Montpellier.

Race overview

On the first stage, Hugo Koblet attacked almost immediately from the start. The peloton got back to him after . Koblet stayed calm for the next stages, until the individual time trial in stage seven, which he won. Initially, Bobet was reported to have won the time trial by one second. Koblet protested against the result, and argued that the intermediate timings showed that Bobet could not have won. The Tour de France jury agreed that Bobet's time was off by one minute, and Koblet was given the stage victory by 59 seconds. Koblet's rival Raphaël Géminiani after the stage said: "If there were two Koblets in the sport I would retire from cycling tomorrow."

In the eleventh stage, Koblet attacked after . He was followed by Louis Deprez for a short while, but when Deprez fell back, Koblet was on his own. It was a hot day, and the other cyclists did not believe that Koblet's escape had any chance. When the peloton heard that Koblet was already three minutes ahead, they started to chase him. They worked together for more than 100 km, but couldn't reach Koblet, who won the stage with a margin of more than two and a half minutes. Directly after Koblet finished, he used a stopwatch to measure the time gap, because he did not trust the Tour's time keepers anymore. The other cyclists were amazed that Koblet had been able to defend his lead against all the other cyclists.

In the twelfth stage, Dutch cyclist Wim van Est escaped, won the stage and took the yellow jersey as leader of the general classification. He was the first Dutch cyclist to do so. Van Est was inexperienced in the mountains that showed up in the thirteenth stage, but did his best to defend his lead. Going up the Aubisque, Van Est punctured and lost time. He tried to gain back time on the descent by following Magni, a fast descender. Van Est could not follow, and crashed. He remounted and rode down again, but took too much risk and fell down a ravine. His fall was broken by trees, 75 meters down. Spectators helped him to climb back, by handing him a rope made from inner tubes. In the next stage, Van Est fell down a ravine while defending his position, and had to abandon the race. Gilbert Bauvin took over the lead. Géminiani crossed the finish line first in that stage, but he was set back to fourth place by the jury.

In the fourteenth stage, Coppi attacked. Koblet punctured, but chased back and reached Coppi, and outsprinted him to win the stage, and thanks to the minute bonification time as stage winner took over the lead. In the sixteenth stage, that seemed not too hard because there were almost no mountains, Coppi collapsed and lost more than half an hour. This was said to be caused by grief over his brother's death, although other accounts said it was because of food poisoning. His teammates and former rivals Gino Bartali and Fiorenzo Magni helped him until the end of the stage.

The Mont Ventoux was climbed in the seventeenth stage for the first time in Tour de France history. Bobet escaped and won the stage, while Koblet was able to stay with his competitors. After that stage, second-placed rider Géminiani was no longer trying to beat Koblet, but instead focussed on defending his second place against Bobet. Koblet stayed out of problems for the rest of the race, and won the time trial in the 22nd stage with a large margin; he even overtook Bartali who had started 8 minutes earlier.

Classification leadership and minor prizes

The time that each cyclist required to finish each stage was recorded, and these times were added together for the general classification. If a cyclist had received a time bonus, it was subtracted from this total; all time penalties were added to this total. The cyclist with the least accumulated time was the race leader, identified by the yellow jersey. Of the 123 cyclists that started the 1951 Tour de France, 66 finished the race.

Points for the mountains classification were earned by reaching the mountain tops first. The system was almost the same as in 1950: there were two types of mountain tops: the hardest ones, in category 1, gave 10 points to the first cyclist, the easier ones, in category 2, gave 6 points to the first cyclist, and the easiest ones, in category 3, gave 3 points. Raphaël Géminiani won this classification.

The team classification was calculated by adding the times in the general classification of the best three cyclists per team. It was won by the French team, with a large margin over the Belgian team. The other three teams that started, Luxembourg, The Netherlands and North Africa, did not finish with three cyclists so were not eligible for the team classification. The Souvenir Henri Desgrange was given in honour of Tour founder Henri Desgrange to the first rider to pass the summit of the Col du Lautaret on stage 21. This prize was won by Gino Sciardis. The special award for the best regional rider was won by eighth-placed Gilbert Bauvin.

Final standings

General classification

Mountains classification

Team classification

Aftermath
Hugo Koblet would be unable to defend his title in the 1952 Tour de France, as he was injured. After that, Koblet never reached the heights that he was able to reach in 1951. Second-placed Géminiani said that he regarded himself as the winner, because Koblet did not count because he was not human.

Van Est, who fell down a ravine wearing the leader's yellow jersey, starred in an advert for watch-making company Pontiac, that said "His heart stopped but his Pontiac kept time."

Notes

References

Bibliography

External links

 
Tour de France by year
Tour De France, 1951
1951 in road cycling
Tour de France
Tour de France